The Ossetian Wikipedia is the Ossetian-language edition of the free online encyclopedia Wikipedia. It was created on 28 February 2005. With approximately  articles, it is currently the -largest Wikipedia as measured by the number of articles. Since its creation, the Ossetian Wikipedia has been called "what is perhaps the only website written entirely in Ossetian."

On 3 March 2010, the Ossetian Wikipedia made headlines in local newspapers for reaching a double milestone. The edition was 5 years old and had just passed the 5000 articles threshold.

Notes

References

External links 

 
 Ossetian Wikipedia (mobile) 
 Ирон Википедийы минæварад The Ossetian Wikipedia's Embassy 

Ossetian-language mass media
Ossetian
European encyclopedias
Internet properties established in 2005
Asian encyclopedias